Sir John Stuart Hamilton, 1st Baronet (circa 1740 – 1802) was an Anglo-Irish politician. 

Hamilton was the Member of Parliament for Strabane in the Irish House of Commons between 1763 and 1797. On 1 February 1781 he was created a baronet, of Dunamana in the Baronetage of Ireland. He was succeeded in his title by his son, also called John.

References

Year of birth uncertain
1802 deaths
18th-century Anglo-Irish people
Baronets in the Baronetage of Ireland
Irish MPs 1761–1768
Irish MPs 1769–1776
Irish MPs 1776–1783
Irish MPs 1783–1790
Irish MPs 1790–1797
Members of the Parliament of Ireland (pre-1801) for County Tyrone constituencies